The Northwestern University Law Review is a law review and student organization at Northwestern University School of Law.  The Law Reviews primary purpose is to publish a journal of broad legal scholarship. The Law Review publishes six issues each year. Student editors make the editorial and organizational decisions and select articles submitted by professors, judges, and practitioners, as well as student pieces.  The Law Review extended its presence onto the web in 2006 and regularly publishes scholarly pieces on Northwestern University Law Review Online (NULR Online).

History 
The Northwestern University Law Review was founded in 1906 by a faculty vote as the Illinois Law Review.  It is the seventh oldest surviving law review in the United States, and only the second notable law review established outside the Northeast (Michigan Law Review having been established in 1902).  Initially, the Law Review was run by the faculty with students only allowed limited roles as associate editors.  By 1932, full editorial control of Northwestern's law review had been handed over to the students.    

At the journal's founding John Henry Wigmore, the first full-time Dean of Northwestern Law School, was a frequent contributor.  Wigmore penned "adversarial editorials that directly addressed the U.S. Supreme Court of the United States and the 'cowardly' members of the Chicago Bar Association."  It has been suggested that Wigmore was motivated to help found a journal after his experience "at Harvard Law School during 1887 and [as a member] of the first editorial board of the Harvard Law Review." 

In 1952, the journal was renamed to Northwestern University Law Review although the existing volume number was retained.

Colloquy
The Northwestern University Law Review Colloquy is a scholarly legal journal that is the online companion to the Northwestern University Law Review located at the Northwestern University School of Law.  Although the Colloquy is published online, its scholarly and journalistic standards are equal to that of the print Law Review.

The Colloquy is the first scholarly weblog to be operated by a major law review.  It features legal commentary in the form of essays, debates, series, book reviews, and responses to print Law Review pieces.  The format of the Colloquy allows scholars to publish their thoughts within weeks of an emerging legal development anywhere within the field of legal inquiry, and provides a convenient forum for scholars to exchange ideas in the wake of such developments in the form of debates or multi-contributor series.  Readers can rely upon the Law Review editors and staff to ensure that citations in these pieces support the assertions made in the posts.  The Colloquy also provides for commenting on the essays and posts in a moderated forum.

Notable alumni 
The Law Review has been staffed and managed by numerous individuals who went on to become well-known legal scholars and practitioners.

Former Editors-in-Chief 

Roscoe Pound, long-time dean of Harvard Law School
 Justice John Paul Stevens
 Governor Daniel Walker
Newton N. Minow, former chairman of the Federal Communications Commission
Kate A. Shaw, professor of law at Benjamin N. Cardozo School of Law

Other Editorial Officers 

 Justice Arthur Goldberg
Adlai Stevenson

Specified contributors
The Law Review History specifically notes a "distinguished list" of contributors as well.

 Dean Leon Green
 Sir William Holdsworth
 Justice Oliver Wendell Holmes
Albert M. Kales
Nathan William MacChesney
Charles T. McCormick
 Sir Frederick Pollock
 Dean Roscoe Pound
 Dean John Henry Wigmore
 Justice Felix Frankfurter
 Justice Tom Clark
 Justice William O. Douglas
 Justice Abe Fortas
 Chief Judge Harry T. Edwards
Erwin Griswold
Archibald Cox
Paul Freund
W. Willard Wirtz
 Albert Ehrenzweig
H. L. A. Hart
Gerald Gunther
Edward H. Levi
Hubert Humphrey
 Brunson MacChesney
 Nathaniel Nathanson
 Dean James A. Rahl
 Dean David Ruder
Martin Redish
Kenneth Culp Davis
Raoul Berger
 Bernard Schwartz
Ian Macneil
John C. Coffee
Gary Lawson
Mary Kay Becker
Stephen Schulhofer
Nadine Strossen
 Judge José A. Cabranes
 Judge Richard Posner
Cass Sunstein

Beyond the Law Reviews traditional legal scholarship, it has published contributions from noted philosopher F. S. C. Northrop, the Right Reverend James A. Pike, Erle Stanley Gardner, and J. Edgar Hoover.

The Law Review has a history of special symposium issues on a broad range of topics.  Recent symposium issues have included: The Law-Stem Alliance and Next Generation Innovation (2016); Democratizing Criminal Law (2016); McCleskey v. Kemp (2017); and Originalism (2018).

Notes

References

External links
http://colloquy.law.northwestern.edu Northwestern University Law Review Colloquy

American law journals
General law journals
Law Review
1906 establishments in Illinois
Publications established in 1906
Law journals edited by students
English-language journals